This is a list of fossiliferous stratigraphic units in Ecuador.


List of fossiliferous stratigraphic units

See also 

 
 Gomphothere fossils in Ecuador
 List of fossiliferous stratigraphic units in Colombia
 List of fossiliferous stratigraphic units in Peru
 South American land mammal ages

References

Further reading 
 G. Bianucci, C. Di Celma, W. Landini and J. Buckeridge. 2006. Palaeoecology and taphonomy of an extraordinary whale barnacle accumulation from the Plio-Pleistocene of Ecuador. Palaeogeography, Palaeoclimatology, Palaeoecology 242:326-342
 
 G. Cantalamessa, C. Di Celma, and L. Ragaini. 2005. Sequence stratigraphy of the Punta Ballena Member of the Jama Formation (Early Pleistocene, Ecuador): insights from integrated sedimentologic, taphonomic and paleoecologic analysis of molluscan shell concentrations. Palaeogeography, Palaeoclimatology, Palaeoecology 216:1-25
 P. F. Hasson and A. G. Fischer. 1986. Observations on the Neogene of Northwestern Ecuador. Micropaleontology 32(1):32-42
 P. Jung. 1989. Revision of the Strombina-group (Gastropoda; Columbellidae), fossil and living. Schweierische Paläontologische Abhandlungen 111:1-298
 
 A. A. Olsson. 1964. Neogene Mollusks From Northwestern Ecuador
 H. A. Pilsbry and A.A. Olsson. 1941. A Pliocene fauna from Western Ecuador. Proceedings of the Natural Sciences of Philadelphia 93:1-79
 
 
 

.Ecuador
 Fossil
 Fossil
Ecuador geography-related lists
Fossil